Saint Lucia participated at the 2018 Summer Youth Olympics in Buenos Aires, Argentina from 6 October to 18 October 2018.

Medalists

Competitors

Athletics

Saint Lucia qualified two athletes, one male and one female.

Swimming

Saint Lucia qualified one athlete.

References

You
Nations at the 2018 Summer Youth Olympics
Saint Lucia at the Youth Olympics